Charles Fries may refer to:

 Charles W. Fries (born 1928), American film and television producer
 Charles Arthur Fries (1854–1940), American painter

See also
Charles Fried (born 1935), American jurist and lawyer
Charles Fry (disambiguation)
Charles Frye (disambiguation)